Hislop Park, also known as Hislop Reserve, is a park in the suburb of Balwyn North, Melbourne, Australia. It is situated between Balwyn Road and the North Balwyn Tennis Club in a portion of a valley through which the Glass Creek runs, now largely through underground drains. It has a number of entrances accessible on foot, including from Albury St and Balwyn Road. The park contains three informal ovals, which are used by sporting clubs throughout the year.

See also 
 Balwyn North

References 

Parks in Melbourne
City of Boroondara